The Wicocomico, Wiccocomoco, Wighcocomoco, or Wicomico (originally called the Wicacoan) were an Algonquian-speaking tribe who lived in Northumberland County, Virginia, at the head and slightly north of the Little Wicomico River. They were the first native people on the mainland encountered by Captain John Smith, prior to his famous interaction with Pamunkee and Pocahontas of the Powhatan people.  Due to constant encroachment and manipulation by settlers, opportunists and Captain Smith, as well as internal conflict regarding how to respond to these, the tribe splintered. The colonial court of Virginia ordered them to merge with a smaller tribe and renamed the Wicocomico.  They  were assigned a flag  -- and a reservation of  near Dividing Creek, south of the Great Wicomico River. 

The grandson of King Machywap Taptico (who was originally considered a friend of John Smith) was forced to sell the last remaining piece of Wicacoan-owned land following the Battle of the Wilderness  fought there, because the ground was so littered with bodies.  Being a massive "burial", the ground could no longer be cultivated. The splintered tribe (some which joined the Powhatan Confederacy,, the rest integrated) was rendered functionally extinct and soon disappeared from the historical record.  

Since the late twentieth century, descendants of king/chief Machywap Taptico have organized, documented history and genealogical records, and are seeking recognition the US government.  Ironically, the external forces/conflicts which caused their functional extinction in the 1700s is the very thing which obstructs recognition of the people today: no tribal land.

History
The Wicocomico people were encountered by Captain John Smith in 1608 as he explored Virginia. He notes a village of about 130 men on the South side of the mouth of the Patawomeke (Potomac) River.

The Northumberland County Court began manipulating and interfering in the governance of the local tribes by the mid-1600s. Sometime between 1652 and 1655, the Court directed the Wicocomico and Chicacoan (or Sekakawons) tribes to merge and relocate slightly south of the Great Wicomico River. They were given 50 acres per fighting man, for a total of  near Dividing Creek. The Lower Cuttatawomen probably merged with them between 1656 and 1659. The merged tribes' adopted the name of "Wicocomico" as that group were the most numerous. The Court appointed Machywap (formerly King of the Chicacoan) as the weroance of the combined tribes, as he had an English wife, was therefore considered a friend of the Smith and his fellow colonists and "easy to manage (manipulate)". By 1659, the  frustrations over encroachment from English colonists boiled over, resulting in the combined majority of the tribes of the  Wicocomico to depose Machywap, possibly by force, and replace him with Pekwem (a Powharan confederacy sympathizer without ties to the English colonists) as their weroance.

There were constant problems with the colonists' encroachment on their lands. From 1660 to 1673, the Wicocomico frequently challenged colonists in court over land disputes. Although most disputes were settled in favor of the Wicocomico, by 1719 they retained only  of their original  reservation. In 1705, Robert Beverley, Jr. wrote "In Northumberland, Wiccocomoco, has but three men living, which yet keep up their Kingdom, and retain their Fashion; they live by themselves, separate from all other Indians, and from the English." After June 1719 and the death of William Taptico, the last Wicocomico weroance, the colonial government confiscated the lands by force. The remnants of the Wicocomico dispersed, and the tribe has been considered extinct. In 1730, the Tobacco Inspection Act of 1730 declared that one of the public tobacco warehouses should be "At Wiccocomico, at Robert Jones's; and at Coan, at the warehouses in Northumberland, under one inspection."

Since the late 20th century, according to their website, descendants of Chief Taptico have worked to document their genealogy and history, as well as to re-organize as a tribe known as the Wicocomico Indian Nation. They have not received state or federal recognition, although they are preparing required documentation for the Bureau of Indian Affairs.

References

Further reading
 Wicocomico History, Wicocomico Indian Nation
 Native Northumberlanders
 Wicocomico Family Tree DNA Project

Eastern Algonquian peoples
Extinct Native American tribes
Native American tribes in Virginia
Native American history of Virginia